Jesse Root (December 28, 1736 – March 29, 1822) was an American minister and lawyer from Coventry, Connecticut. During the American Revolution he served on the Connecticut Council of Safety and in the Connecticut militia. Originally appointed as a lieutenant colonel in Peekskill in 1777, he rose to the rank of Adjutant-General of the Connecticut Line. He was a delegate to the Continental Congress for Connecticut from 1778 until 1782, and sat as chief justice of the Connecticut Supreme Court from 1796 to 1807 as well as a state court judge. He served in the Connecticut House of Representatives and served in the Connecticut Constitutional Convention. He was also a member of the First Company, Governor's Foot Guard, serving as its commandant between May 1798 and October 1802.

His grandson was Austin Cornelius Dunham.

References

External links

A short text on the origin of Connecticut's laws by Root (1798)

1736 births
1822 deaths
People from Coventry, Connecticut
Members of the Connecticut General Assembly Council of Assistants (1662–1818)
Members of the Connecticut House of Representatives
Connecticut state court judges
Chief Justices of the Connecticut Supreme Court
Continental Congressmen from Connecticut
18th-century American politicians
Connecticut militiamen in the American Revolution
People of colonial Connecticut
Military personnel from Connecticut